Bjørnar Kaldefoss Tveite (born 12 October 1987 at Voss, Norway) is a Norwegian jazz upright bassist, known from bands like Hullyboo and Morning Has Occurred.

Karriere
Tveite linked musical ties with guitarist Marius Hirth Klovning already at Voss ungdomsskule. Then they have played together steadily in various contexts since. They started the band Hullyboo, which play self composed material, along with drummer Mats Mæland Jensen. Im 2009 they won the Jazz i sikte competition along with the trio Lugom, where Tveite collaborates with Marte Eberson, who is the main songwriter, and drummer Andreas Wildhagen.

Together with front figure and singer Natalie Sandtorv, Marte Eberson an Ole Mofjell, he performed on stages across Europe and in Japan with the Quartet 'Morning Has Occurred' with a current self titled debut album (2014).

Utmerkelser 
2009: Winner of the Jazz i sikte within the bands Hullyboo and Lugom

Diskografi 

2020 Northwestern songs, Arne Torvik trio, Losen Records
2019 Farkost, Hullyboo, Øra Fonogram
2019 Lang Vinter, Caroline Wallace, Øra Fonogram
2014 Morning Has Occurred, Morning Has Occurred, Ocean Sound Recordings
2014 Live I, Sjøen, Havtorn Records
2012 Bønner og flesk, Hullyboo, NORCD

References

External links 
"Old Wind" Morning has Occurred – Vestnorsk jazzsenter at YouTube
Monitor: Morning Has Occurred og Karl Seglem at YouTube

1987 births
Living people
Norwegian University of Science and Technology alumni
Hubro Music artists
Norwegian jazz upright-bassists
Male double-bassists
Norwegian jazz composers
Musicians from Voss
21st-century double-bassists
21st-century Norwegian male musicians
Morning Has Occurred members